Ptychochromis inornatus is an endangered species of cichlid endemic to the Ankofia River basin and its tributaries in the eastern part of the Mahajanga Province in Madagascar. It is threatened by habitat loss. It reaches  in standard length.

References

External links 
 Photograph

inornatus
Freshwater fish of Madagascar
Fish described in 2002
Taxonomy articles created by Polbot